The 2015 Denver mayoral election took place on May 5, 2015. Incumbent Michael Hancock ran for re-election and won. His nearest competitor, Marcus Giavanni, had about 8.5 percent. This was the first time in 20 years that Denver did not hold a Mayoral Debate and was called off by League of Women Voters of Denver.

Candidates
 Michael Hancock
 Marcus Giavanni
Seku
 Paul Noel Fiorino
 Write-in

Results

References

Denver
2015
Mayoral elections in Denver
2015 Colorado elections